Pieter Cornelisz Verbeeck (1610–1654) was a Dutch Golden Age painter.

Biography
Verbeeck was born and died in Haarlem.  According to Houbraken, he taught (horse) painting to Gillis Schagen, the son of an important councilman of Alkmaar.

According to the RKD in 1635 he moved to Alkmaar where he married and became a member of the Guild of St. Luke there. In 1638 he moved to Utrecht, but after his wife died in 1642 he returned to Haarlem, where he married Elisabeth van Beresteyn, the sister of his friend Claes van Beresteyn, in 1643 and where he became a member of the Haarlem Guild of St. Luke in 1645. He painted still life, landscapes and portraits.

References

Pieter Cornelisz Verbeeck on Artnet
 

1610 births
1654 deaths
Dutch Golden Age painters
Dutch male painters
Artists from Haarlem
Painters from Alkmaar
Painters from Haarlem